Grady is a gender-neutral given name of Irish origin, derived from the Irish word gráda, meaning "noble" or "renowned".

Notable people with the given name "Grady" include

A
Grady Adkins (1897–1966), American baseball player
Grady Alderman (1938–2018), American football player
Grady Allen (1946–2012), American football player

B
Grady Avenell (born 1972), American musician
Grady Benton (born 1973), American football player
Grady Booch (born 1955), American software engineer
Grady Brewer (born 1970), American boxer
Grady Brown (born 1944), American politician

C
Grady Cavness (born 1947), American football player
Grady Champion (born 1969), American blues musician
Grady Chapman (1929–2011), American singer-songwriter
Grady Clay (1916–2013), American journalist and landscape architect
Grady Cofer, American visual effects artist
Grady Cooper, American film director
Grady C. Cothen (1920–2017), American minister

D
Grady Diangana (born 1998), Congolese footballer
Gradey Dick (born 2003), American basketball player

E
Grady Easton (born 2002), American soccer player

F
Grady Fuson (born 1956), American baseball scout

G
Grady Gaines (1934–2021), American musician
Grady Gammage (1892–1959), American educator

H
Grady Hall, American screenwriter
Grady Hatton (1922–2013), American baseball player
Grady Hendrix, American author
Grady Higginbotham (1892–1989), American football and baseball player
Grady Howard (1911–1989), American politician
Grady Howe (born 1994), American soccer player
Grady Hunt (1921–2013), American costume designer

J
Grady Jackson (born 1973), American football player
Grady Jarrett (born 1993), American football player
Grady Judd (born 1954), American police officer

K
Grady R. Kent (1909–1964), American theologian

L
Grady Lewis (1917–2009), American basketball player
Grady Little (born 1950), American baseball player
Grady Livingston (born 1972), American football player

M
Grady Martin (1929–2001), American musician
Grady Mathews (born 1943), American pool player
Grady Louis McMurtry (1918–1985), American soldier and occultist
Grady McWhiney (1928–2006), American historian

N
Grady Norton (1894–1954), American meteorologist
Grady Nutt (1934–1982), American minister

O
Grady O'Cummings III (??–1996), American political figure
Grady O'Malley (born 1948), American basketball player

P
Grady Patterson (1924–2009), American politician

R
Grady Reynolds, American basketball player
Grady Richardson (born 1952), American football player

S
Grady Sizemore (born 1982), American baseball player
Grady Stiles (1937–1992), American freak show performer
Grady Sutton (1906–1995), American actor

T
Grady Tate (1932–2017), American singer
Grady Thomas (born 1941), American musician

W
Grady Wallace (1934–2006), American basketball player
Grady Ward (born 1951), American software engineer
Grady Watts (1908–1986), American jazz musician
Grady Webster (1927–2005), American botanist and taxonomist
Grady Wilson (disambiguation), multiple people

See also
Grady (surname), a page for people with the surname "Grady"
Grady (disambiguation), a disambiguation page for "Grady"

Notes

Irish given names
Irish unisex given names